Kaposkeresztúr is a village in Somogy county, Hungary.

The settlement is part of the Balatonboglár wine region.

References

External links 
 Street map (Hungarian)

Populated places in Somogy County
Hungarian German communities in Somogy County